Divine Waters is a documentary film released in 1985 (shot in 1981) featuring Divine and John Waters, along with Waters' father John Waters Sr. and sister Trish Waters.

Synopsis
This documentary focuses on the careers of influential partners in trash film, John Waters and Divine. The film includes interviews with Waters' parents and sister, actress Edith Massey sings two songs ("Punks, Get off the Grass" and "Fever"), as well as a live performance of Divine performing his song "Born to Be Cheap".

Cast
 Divine
 John Waters
 John Waters Sr.
 Trish Waters
 Edith Massey

References

External links
 

1985 films
American documentary films
1985 documentary films
John Waters
Drag (clothing)-related films
1980s English-language films
1980s American films